The Jaguars–Texans rivalry is a professional American football rivalry in the National Football League (NFL) between the Jacksonville Jaguars and the Houston Texans. Having begun play in 1995 and 2002, respectively, the Jaguars and Texans are among two of the most-recently established franchises in the NFL, with its origins in the 2000s. The Texans specifically became the 32nd NFL franchise, leading the NFL to realign its divisions to create eight divisions of four teams. The Jaguars were moved from the AFC Central to the newly formed AFC South, which the Texans were also placed into. Since then, they have competed as division rivals. Through the end of the 2022 season, the Texans lead the series 28–14.

2000s 
The 2000s proved to be an even decade for the rivalry, with both teams winning eight games against the other. Three of the first four games played between the two teams were close affairs; the exception, a 27–0 Jaguars blowout win was the first shutouts suffered by the Texans in their franchise history.

The first match between the two teams occurred in Jacksonville on October 27, 2002. The Texans won the game 21–19 as Kris Brown kicked a game-winning field goal with 54 seconds left to help Houston earn its first away victory in franchise history.

In 2008, the Jaguars defeated the Texans in an overtime match. David Garrard, the Jaguars' starting quarterback for much of the rivalry during the late 2000s, helped Jacksonville set up a game winning field-goal. Josh Scobee would deliver the kick to win 30–27.

2010s 

Unlike the 2000s, season series splits were rare, only occurring in 2010. The Houston Texans dominated the rivalry during the 2010s, sweeping the series in seven of ten seasons. The Jaguars were able to pull off series sweeps in 2013 and 2017. The latter occurred en route to an AFC Championship game appearance for the Jaguars.

In the 2011 NFL Draft, the Jaguars and Texans had the 10th and 11th picks, respectively. Needing a quarterback, the Jaguars selected Blaine Gabbert from Missouri, while the Texans selected defensive lineman J. J. Watt from Wisconsin. While Gabbert flamed out after three seasons in Jacksonville and was eventually traded, Watt became a three-time NFL Defensive Player of the Year winner and, in the process, became a notable figure of the rivalry.

In 2010, the Jaguars won at home 31–24 thanks to a successful 50-yard Hail Mary attempt by Garrard as time ran out. Notably, Texans cornerback Glover Quin tipped the ball down before it was caught by Jaguars receiver Mike Thomas.

One of the more memorable games of the rivalry is a 43–37 overtime victory by the Texans in 2012. Playing at home, they were nearly upset by the Jaguars, but quarterback Matt Schaub completed a touchdown pass to wide receiver Andre Johnson with two minutes left in overtime to secure a victory. Schaub threw for 527 passing yards and 5 passing touchdowns during the game, both career highs. The former also ranks as the second-most passing yards in a single game in NFL history. Johnson's 14 receptions for 273 yards were both career highs, with the latter being a team record.

Deshaun Watson, who played for the Texans from 2017–2021, has been cited as another player who helped the Texans dominate the Jaguars in the rivalry.

2020s
The Texans continued their dominance of the rivalry to begin the 2020s. In 2022, Sports Illustrated writer Zach Dimmit wrote "it might be hard to find a more historically lopsided division rivalry in the league."

Watt recorded his 100th career sack in a win against the Jaguars in 2020. 

In 2022, the previously winless Texans defeated the Jaguars 13–6, as they forced Jaguars quarterback Trevor Lawrence into multiple turnovers. However, during the teams' second matchup of the season, Jacksonville blew out the Texans 31–3, snapping Houston's 9-game winning streak in the rivalry series.

Season-by-season results 

|-
| 
| Tie 1–1
| style="| Texans  21–19
| style="| Jaguars  24–21
| Tied  1–1
| 
|-
| 
| Tie 1–1
| style="| Jaguars  27–0
| style="| Texans  24–20
| Tied  2–2
| 
|-
| 
| style="| Texans 2–0
| style="| Texans  21–0
| style="| Texans  20–6
| Texans  4–2
| Texans complete rivalry's first season sweep
|-
| 
| style="| Jaguars 2–0
| style="| Jaguars  21–14
| style="| Jaguars  38–20
| Tied  4–4
| 
|-
| 
| style="| Texans 2–0
| style="| Texans  13–10
| style="| Texans  27–7
| Texans  6–4
| 
|-
| 
| Tie 1–1
| style="| Jaguars  37–17
| style="| Texans  42–28
| Texans  7–5
| 
|-
| 
| Tie 1–1
| style="| Jaguars  30–27 (OT)
| style="| Texans  30–17
| Texans  8–6
| 
|-
| 
| style="| Jaguars 2–0
| style="| Jaguars  23–18
| style="| Jaguars  31–24
| Tied  8–8
|
|-

|-
| 
| Tie 1–1
| style="| Jaguars  31–24
| style="| Texans  34–17
| Tied  9–9
| 
|-
| 
| style="| Texans 2–0
| style="| Texans  20–13
| style="| Texans  24–14
| Texans  11–9
| J. J. Watt's first season with the Texans.
|-
| 
| style="| Texans 2–0
| style="| Texans  27–7
| style="| Texans  43–37 (OT)
| Texans  13–9
| 
|-
| 
| style="| Jaguars 2–0
| style="| Jaguars  27–20
| style="| Jaguars  13–6
| Texans  13–11
| 
|-
| 
| style="| Texans 2–0
| style="| Texans  27–13
| style="| Texans  23–17
| Texans  15–11
|
|-
| 
| style="| Texans 2–0
| style="| Texans  31–20
| style="| Texans  30–6
| Texans  17–11
|
|-
| 
| style="| Texans 2–0
| style="| Texans  21–20
| style="| Texans  24–21
| Texans  19–11
|
|-
| 
| style="| Jaguars 2–0
| style="| Jaguars  45–7
| style="| Jaguars  29–7
| Texans  19–13
| 
|-
| 
| style="| Texans 2–0
| style="| Texans  20–7
| style="| Texans  20–3
| Texans  21–13
|
|-
| 
| style="| Texans 2–0
| style="| Texans  26–3
| style="| Texans  13–12
| Texans  23–13
| Jaguars home game played at Wembley Stadium in London as part of NFL International Series.
|-

|-
| 
| style="| Texans 2–0
| style="| Texans  27–25
| style="| Texans  30–14
| Texans  25–13
|
|-
| 
| style="| Texans 2–0
| style="| Texans  30–16
| style="| Texans  37–21
| Texans  27–13
|
|-
| 
| Tie 1–1
| style="| Texans  13–6
| style="| Jaguars  31–3
| Texans  28–14
| Texans win nine straight meetings (2018–22).
|- 

|-
| Regular season
| style="| Texans  28–14
| Texans  13–8
| Texans  15–6
| Texans 1–0 in London (officially a Jaguars home game)
|-

References

Further reading

Houston Texans
Jacksonville Jaguars
National Football League rivalries
Houston Texans rivalries
Jacksonville Jaguars rivalries